Joan Violet Robinson  (née Maurice; 31 October 1903 – 5 August 1983) was a British economist well known for her wide-ranging contributions to economic theory. She was a central figure in what became known as post-Keynesian economics.

Biography
Before leaving to fight in the Second Boer War, Joan's father, Frederick Maurice, married Margaret Helen Marsh, the daughter of Frederick Howard Marsh, and the sister of Edward Marsh, at St George's, Hanover Square. Joan Maurice was born in 1903, a year after her father's return from Africa.

During World War II, Robinson worked on a few different Committees for the wartime national government. During this time, she visited the Soviet Union as well as China, gaining an interest in underdeveloped and developing nations.

Robinson was a frequent visitor to Centre for Development Studies (CDS), Thiruvananthapuram, India. She was a visiting fellow at the Centre in the mid-1970s. She instituted an endowment fund to support public lectures at the Centre. She was a frequent visitor to the Centre until January 1982 and participated in all activities of the Centre and especially student seminars. Professor Robinson donated royalties of two of her books (Selected Economic Writings, Bombay: Oxford University Press, 1974, Introduction to Modern Economics (jointly with John Eatwell), Delhi; Tata McGraw Hill, 1974) to CDS.

Robinson also made several trips to China, reporting her observations and analyses in China: An Economic Perspective (1958), The Cultural Revolution in China (1969), and Economic Management in China (1975; 3rd edn, 1976), in which she praised the Cultural Revolution. In October 1964, Robinson also visited North Korea, which was effectively a single-party Communist state, and wrote in her report "Korean Miracle" that the country's success was due to "the intense concentration of the Koreans on national pride" under Kim Il-sung, "a messiah rather than a dictator." She also stated in reference to the division of Korea that "[o]bviously, sooner or later the country must be reunited by absorbing the South into socialism." During her last decade, she became more and more pessimistic about the possibilities of reforming economic theory, as expressed, for example, in her essay "Spring Cleaning."

Robinson was a strict vegetarian. She slept in a small unheated hut at the bottom of garden all year round.

Education 
She studied economics at Girton College, Cambridge, and immediately after graduation in 1925, she married the economist Austin Robinson. In 1937, she became a lecturer in economics at the University of Cambridge. She joined the British Academy in 1958 and was elected a fellow of Newnham College in 1962. In 1965 she assumed the position of full professor and fellow of Girton College. In 1979, just four years before she died, she became the first female honorary fellow of King's College.

As a member of "the Cambridge School" of economics, Robinson contributed to the support and exposition of Keynes' General Theory, writing especially on its employment implications in 1936 and 1937 (it attempted to explain employment dynamics in the midst of the Great Depression).

Works 

In 1933, her book The Economics of Imperfect Competition, Robinson coined the term "monopsony," which is used to describe the buyer converse of a seller monopoly. Monopsony is commonly applied to buyers of labour, where the employer has wage setting power that allows it to exercise Pigouvian exploitation and pay workers less than their marginal productivity. Robinson used monopsony to describe the wage gap between women and men workers of equal productivity.

In 1942, Robinson's An Essay on Marxian Economics famously concentrated on Karl Marx as an economist, helping to revive the debate on this aspect of his legacy.

In 1956, Robinson published her magnum opus, The Accumulation of Capital, which extended Keynesianism into the long run.

In 1962, she published Essays in the Theory of Economic Growth, another book on growth theory, which discussed Golden Age growth paths. Afterwards, she developed the Cambridge growth theory with Nicholas Kaldor. She was elected a Foreign Honorary Member of the American Academy of Arts and Sciences in 1964.

In 1984, Robinson was elected to the American Philosophical Society. 

Near the end of her life, she studied and concentrated on methodological problems in economics and tried to recover the original message of Keynes' General Theory. Between 1962 and 1980, she wrote many economics books for the general public. Robinson suggested developing an alternative to the revival of classical economics.

The Cultural Revolution in China is written from the perspective of trying to understand the thinking that lay behind the revolution, particularly Mao Zedong's preoccupations. Mao is seen as aiming to recapture a revolutionary sense in a population that had known only, or had grown used to, stable Communism, so that it could "re-educate the Party" (pp. 20, 27); to instill a realisation that the people needed the guidance of the Party and much as the other way round (p. 20); to re-educate intellectuals who failed to see that their role in society, like that of all other groups, was to 'Serve the People' (pp. 33, 43); and finally to secure a succession, not stage-managed by the Party hierarchy or even by Mao himself but the product of interaction between a revitalised people and a revitalised Party (p. 26).

On the whole, the book emphasises the positive aspects of Mao's "moderate and humane" intentions (p. 19) rather than the "violence and disorder" that broke out, we are told, "from time to time", occurrences "strongly opposed" (ibid.) to Mao's wishes. Robinson recognises and appears to endorse a revision to classical Marxism in Mao's view of the relation of base to superstructure: "On the classical view, there is one-way determination between base and superstructure but Mao shows how the superstructure may react upon the base: Ideas may become a material force" (p. 12). She acknowledges that "Old-fashioned Marxists might regard this as a heresy, but that is scarcely reasonable" (ibid.).

In June 2019, the United States Supreme Court used Robinson's monopsony theory in its decision for Apple v. Pepper. Justice Brett Kavanaugh delivered the majority opinion, stating Apple can be sued by application developers, "on a monopsony theory."

Achievements 
In 1945, she was appointed to the Ministry of Works' Advisory Committee on Building Research, the only economist and the only female member of that committee.

In 1948, she was appointed the first economist member of the Monopolies and Mergers Commission.

In 1949, she was invited by Ragnar Frisch to become the Vice-President of the Econometric Society but declined by saying she that could not be part of the editorial committee of a journal that she could not read.

During the 1960s, she was a major participant in the Cambridge capital controversy alongside Piero Sraffa.

At least two students who studied under her have won the Sveriges Riksbank Prize in Economic Sciences in Memory of Alfred Nobel; they are Amartya Sen and Joseph Stiglitz. In his autobiographical notes for the Nobel Foundation, Stiglitz described their relationship as "tumultuous" and Robinson as unused to "the kind of questioning stance of a brash American student"; after a term, Stiglitz therefore "switched to Frank Hahn". In his own autobiography notes, Sen described Robinson as "totally brilliant but vigorously intolerant."

She also influenced Indian Prime Minister Manmohan Singh which altered his approach towards economic policies.

Family 
Joan's father was Frederick Maurice, her mother was Margaret Helen Marsh.

Joan Maurice married fellow economist Austin Robinson in 1926. They had two daughters.

The distinguished London surgeon and Cambridge academic Howard Marsh was Joan Robinson's maternal grandfather.

Recognition 
In 2016, the Council of the University of Cambridge approved the use of Robinson's name to mark a physical feature within the North West Cambridge Development.

Major works 
 The Economics of Imperfect Competition (1933)
 Essays in the Theory of Employment (1937)
 An Essay on Marxian Economics (1942), Second Edition (1966) (The Macmillan Press Ltd)
 The Production Function and the Theory of Capital (1953)
 Accumulation of Capital (1956)
 Exercises in Economic Analysis (1960)
 Essays in the Theory of Economic Growth (1962)
 Economic Philosophy: An Essay on the Progress of Economic Thought (1962)
 Freedom and Necessity: An Introduction to the Study of Society (1970)
 Economic Heresies: Some Old Fashioned Questions in Economic Theory (1971) (Basic Books, New York)
 Contributions to Modern Economics (1978) (Basil Blackwell, Oxford)
 Further Contributions to Modern Economics (1980) (Basil Blackwell, Oxford)

Texts for the lay reader 
 Economics is a serious subject: The apologia of an economist to the mathematician, the scientist and the plain man (1932), W. Heffer & Sons
 Introduction to the Theory of Employment (1937)
 The Cultural Revolution in China, Harmondsworth: Pelican Original (1969)
 An Introduction to Modern Economics (1973) with John Eatwell
 The Arms Race (1981), Tanner Lectures on Human Values

See also
 International economics
 List of economists
 Macroeconomics
 Wealth condensation
 Welfare economics

References

Further reading
 Emani, Zohreh, 2000, "Joan Robinson" in Robert W. Dimand et al. (eds), A Biographical Dictionary of Women Economists, Edward Elgar.
 Harcourt, G. C., 1995, Obituary: Joan Robinson 1903–1983, Economic Journal, Vol. 105, No. 432. (September 1995), pp. 1228–1243.
 Harcourt, G. C. and Kerr, P. (2009). Joan Robinson. Palgrave MacMillan. 
 Pasinetti, Luigi L. (1987), "Robinson, Joan Violet," The New Palgrave: A Dictionary of Economics, v. 4, pp. 212–17, Macmillan.
 Vianello, F. [1996], "Joan Robinson on Normal Prices (and the Normal rate of Profits)", in: Marcuzzo, M.C. and Pasinetti, L. and Roncaglia, A. (eds.), The Economics of Joan Robinson, New York: Routledge, .

External links

 Joan Violet Robinson, 1903–1983 The New School
 Joan Robinson at Stanford, May 1974 Australian School of Business, 27 March 2009 – Three hours of Robinson' lectures at Stanford, 1974
 
 
 On Re-Reading Marx, by Joan Robinson, (Cambridge, England: 1953)

1903 births
1983 deaths
British women economists
Post-Keynesian economists
Macroeconomists
Keynesians
Historians of economic thought
People educated at St Paul's Girls' School
Alumni of Girton College, Cambridge
Fellows of the American Academy of Arts and Sciences
Fellows of the British Academy
Fellows of Girton College, Cambridge
Fellows of Newnham College, Cambridge
Fellows of King's College, Cambridge
People from Surrey
20th-century  British economists
20th-century English historians
20th-century British women writers
Members of the American Philosophical Society